Sailor's Holiday refers to:

 Sailor's Holiday (1929 film)
 Sailor's Holiday (1944 film)